The  is a railway line operated by the Kantō Railway in Ibaraki Prefecture in Japan.

History
The Ryuzaki Railway Co. opened the line on 14 August 1900 as a  gauge steam-operated line.

The company merged with the Kashima Sangu Railway Co. in 1944, which merged with the Kanto Railway Co. in 1965.

Freight services ceased in 1971, the same year the line switched to driver-only-operation (in August 1971), becoming the first driver-only-operation line in Japan.

Stations

References

This article incorporates material from the corresponding article in the Japanese Wikipedia

Kantō Railway
Railway lines opened in 1900
1900 establishments in Japan
1067 mm gauge railways in Japan
2 ft 6 in gauge railways in Japan